Play Tour: En Directo is the first video release by Spanish singer Aitana. The album features Aitana's set from her Play Tour concert at the Palau Sant Jordi in Barcelona, which took place on November 3, 2019. The album was released in physical stores on July 24, 2020 and features guest appearances from Alfred García. It was released on Movistar+ on November 6.

Background 
Aitana embarked on the Play Tour starting in June 2019 to support her debut album Spoiler (2019). That same month, the singer confirmed on El Hormiguero that her debut album would be reissued later that year, leading to Spoiler: Re-Play, a reedition of the album that features some acoustic performances and an extensive tour documentary, which follows the singer backstage, on her way to the gig, getting ready and, obviously, performing. This project was released exclusively in physical stores on December 20, 2019 and received moderate success.

The Play Tour suffered complications with the celebration of a second leg in Europe and a series of planned concerts in Latin America due to the outbreak of the COVID-19 pandemic. To guarantee the security of the assistants, all tour stops were cancelled in May 2020 only leaving the final concert in Madrid and another one in Marbella. On July 15, 2020, Universal Music confirmed the release of "Play Tour: En Directo", another  tour documentary that would follow Aitana during her concert at Barcelona's Palau Sant Jordi, Spain's largest indoor arena, which she sold out in less than a week in the context of her debut tour. The live album will be released exclusively in physical stores on July 24, 2020.

On release day the performances of "Presiento" and "Vas a Quedarte" were uploaded on the singer's YouTube channel.

Track listing 
Track listing adapted from Tidal. All tracks are noted as "live".

References 

2020 live albums
Aitana (singer) albums